Cacupira is a genus of longhorn beetles of the subfamily Lamiinae, containing the following species:

 Cacupira iodina (Bates, 1881)
 Cacupira tucurui Martins & Galileo, 1991

References

Hemilophini